Misanthropic Generation is the fifth album by Swedish D-beat band Disfear. It is the first full-length album from the band to feature Tomas Lindberg on vocals.

Track listing

References

Disfear albums
2003 albums